Sophie Davies is an Australian diplomat and its first Ambassador to Colombia since 2017 when they opened the embassy in Bogotá. She is a career diplomat with the Department of Foreign Affairs and Trade (DFAT). She previously served as its Deputy Head of Mission of the Australian Embassy in Lima, Peru.

Davies studied Bachelor of Economics/Laws from the University of Sydney and earned her Masters of Evaluation from the University of Melbourne,  Masters of Social Science from the Royal Melbourne Institute of Technology.

References 

Australian diplomats
Australian women ambassadors
Living people
Year of birth missing (living people)
University of Sydney alumni
University of Melbourne alumni
RMIT University alumni